1310 G Street is a high-rise skyscraper building located in Washington, D.C., United States. Its construction was completed in 1992. The architect of the building was Skidmore, Owings & Merrill who designed the postmodern architectural style of the building. The high-rise serves as an office building.

1310 G Street is located in the East End neighborhood of Washington, DC. The East End has transformed over the last two decades into a hub for retail, hospitality, and public and private sector offices. 
It is also home to Capital One Arena, the home of the NBA's Washington Wizards and the NHL's Stanley Cup-winning Washington Capitals, as well as the region's premier concert venue.

1310 G Street is just a 1/2 block from one of the Metro system's three major hubs, Metro Center. The neighborhood is also home to Gallery Place-Chinatown which combined provide access to every Metro line.

See also
List of tallest buildings in Washington, D.C.

References

Skyscraper office buildings in Washington, D.C.
Skidmore, Owings & Merrill buildings
Office buildings completed in 1992
1992 establishments in Washington, D.C.